is a Japanese football player who plays as a goalkeeper for V-Varen Nagasaki.

Career
Kasahara made his debut for Mito HollyHock in the Emperor Cup match against Oita Trinita on 9 September 2012.

Club statistics
Updated to 23 February 2018.

References

External links
Profile at Mito HollyHock

1988 births
Living people
Meiji University alumni
Association football people from Saitama Prefecture
Japanese footballers
J2 League players
Mito HollyHock players
Omiya Ardija players
V-Varen Nagasaki players
Association football goalkeepers